Frederick H. Bealefeld III is the former police commissioner of the Baltimore Police Department.

References

American police chiefs
Commissioners of the Baltimore Police Department
Living people
Year of birth missing (living people)